Orwellian is an adjective describing a situation, idea, or societal condition that George Orwell identified as being destructive to the welfare of a free and open society. It denotes an attitude and a brutal policy of draconian control by propaganda, surveillance, disinformation, denial of truth (doublethink), and manipulation of the past, including the "unperson"—a person whose past atrocity is idealised from the public record and memory, practiced by modern repressive governments. Often, this includes the circumstances depicted in his novels, particularly Nineteen Eighty-Four but political doublespeak is criticized throughout his work, such as in Politics and the English Language.

The New York Times has said the term is "the most widely used adjective derived from the name of a modern writer".

See also

References

External links

 Finding Orwell in Burma

George Orwell
Nineteen Eighty-Four
Freedom of expression
Censorship
Totalitarianism